Riley Wade Smith (born January 15, 1995) is an American professional baseball pitcher for the Bravos de León of the Mexican League. He has played in Major League Baseball (MLB) for the Arizona Diamondbacks.

Amateur career
Smith attended Hudson High School in Lufkin, Texas. Undrafted out of high school in 2013, Smith attended San Jacinto College for two years. He went 6–2 with a 2.30 ERA and 54 strikeouts over 70 innings in 2014. He posted a 7–2 record with a 2.96 ERA and 85 strikeouts over 75 innings in 2015. Smith helped lead the San Jacinto Gators to the NJCAA World Series in 2015. Smith was drafted by the Pittsburgh Pirates in the 31st round of the 2015 MLB draft, but did not sign and transferred to Louisiana State University for the 2016 season. Smith went 2–1 with a 7.22 ERA over 32 innings in 2016. Smith was drafted by the Arizona Diamondbacks in the 24th round, with the 719th overall selection, of the 2016 MLB draft and signed with them.

Professional career

Arizona Diamondbacks
Smith spent his professional debut season of 2016 with the Hillsboro Hops, going 2–0 with a 2.51 ERA over 32 innings. He split the 2017 season between Hillsboro and the Kane County Cougars, going a combined 7–4 with a 3.07 ERA over  innings. He spent 2018 with the Visalia Rawhide, going 8–6 with a 3.57 ERA over 151 innings. He split the 2019 season between the Jackson Generals and the Reno Aces, going a combined 6–6 with a 4.43 ERA over  innings.  

Smith was added to the Diamondbacks 40-man roster following the 2019 season.

Smith was promoted to the major leagues for the first time on August 24, 2020. He made his debut on August 26 against the Colorado Rockies. In 6 games, Smith was 1–0 with a 1.47 ERA in  innings. Smith made 24 appearances for Arizona in 2021, but struggled to a 6.01 ERA with 36 strikeouts in  innings of work. He was outrighted off of the 40-man roster following the season on November 19, 2021. On April 12, 2022, Smith was released by the Diamondbacks organization.

Colorado Rockies
On May 2, 2022, Smith signed with the Wild Health Genomes of the Atlantic League of Professional Baseball. On May 9, the Colorado Rockies signed Smith to a minor league deal. He made 19 appearances (17 starts) for the Triple-A Albuquerque Isotopes, struggling to a 4-7 record and 8.06 ERA with 80 strikeouts in 92.2 innings pitched. He elected free agency on November 10, 2022.

Bravos de León
On February 17, 2023, Smith signed with the Bravos de León of the Mexican League.

References

External links

LSU Tigers bio

1995 births
Living people
People from Lufkin, Texas
Baseball players from Texas
Major League Baseball pitchers
Arizona Diamondbacks players
LSU Tigers baseball players
San Jacinto Central Ravens baseball players
Hillsboro Hops players
Kane County Cougars players
Visalia Rawhide players
Jackson Generals (Southern League) players
Reno Aces players